Ashokpuri Goswami is a Gujarati poet and writer from Gujarat, India. He won Sahitya Akademi Award for Gujarati language in 1997 for his novel Koovo (1994).

Life
He was born on 17 August 1947 in Borsad, Anand district, Gujarat to Kailasbharati and Kamlabahen. His family belonged to Ashi village near Petlad. He completed his primary and secondary education in Navli, Anand. He completed old S.S.C. from B. M. Patel High School, Navli. He completed B.Sc. from V. P. College, Sardar Patel University but dropped out due to poor financial condition. He started working as a farmer at his village. He married Ansooyaji on 21 April 1965. Their son Aayushman was born on 16 July 1998.

Works
He wrote his first poem while studying S.S.C. His ghazals were first published in Kavilok, and later he published in other Gujarati literary magazines including Kumar, Shabdasrishti, Vi and Navneet Samarpan.

Arthat (1990) and Kaling (2005) are his collections of ghazals. Mool, his first novel was published in 1990, followed by Koovo (1994), Nibhado (1995), Vedh (1999) Ame (2015) and Gajra. Ravarvaat (1994) is an autobiographical work. He has edited story collection, Vinela Moti (1995). He has edited Setu (2003), a literary magazine published for non-resident Indians, and Rooplabdhi (2005) published by Charotar Vidya Mandal on occasion of session held by Gujarati Sahitya Parishad. He has also translated Dilip Ramesh's Hindi play, Khand Khand Agni.

Awards
He won the Sahitya Akademi Award for Gujarati language in 1997 for his novel Koovo (1994). He also won Govardhanram Tripathi Award in 1995 and Best Book Prize of Gujarat Sahitya Akademi in 1996 for his novel Nibhado (1995).

References

External links 
 

1947 births
Gujarati-language writers
Indian male novelists
Recipients of the Sahitya Akademi Award in Gujarati
Living people
20th-century Indian novelists
Novelists from Gujarat
People from Anand district
Indian male poets
20th-century Indian poets
Poets from Gujarat
20th-century Indian male writers